The 8th is the eighth studio album by Canadian country music group Doc Walker. It was released on October 21, 2014 by Open Road Recordings. The album includes the singles "Put It into Drive", "Shake It Like It's Saturday Night" and "That's How I Like It".

Track listing

Chart performance

Singles

References

2014 albums
Doc Walker albums
Open Road Recordings albums
Albums produced by Gavin Brown (musician)
Albums recorded at Noble Street Studios